Oliver Douglas Bruce (born 23 May 1947) is a former New Zealand rugby union player and coach. A first five-eighth, Bruce represented Mid Canterbury and Canterbury at a provincial level, and was a member of the New Zealand national side, the All Blacks, from 1974 to 1978. He played 41 matches for the All Blacks including 14 internationals. He went on to be the assistant coach of Canterbury between 1982 and 1985, and the coach of that side from 1987 to 1988.

References

1947 births
Living people
Rugby union players from Dunedin
People educated at Ashburton College
New Zealand rugby union players
New Zealand international rugby union players
Mid Canterbury rugby union players
Canterbury rugby union players
Rugby union fly-halves
New Zealand rugby union coaches